Bede Liu (born 1934) is a professor emeritus at Princeton University. He was born in Shanghai, China in 1934. He received his bachelor's degree in electrical engineering at National Taiwan University. He earned his master's degree and doctorate in 1956 and 1960, respectively, in electrical engineering, from what is now called New York University Tandon School of Engineering.

Liu has received the IEEE Fourier Award for Signal Processing. He was elected a member of the National Academy of Engineering in 2002 for contributions to the analysis and implementation of digital signal processing algorithms. He was also elected a member of Academia Sinica in 2006. He has a number of patents to his credits.

Liu's doctoral students include 2 members of the U.S. National Academy of Engineering, 25 IEEE Fellows, 4 IEEE Millennium medalists.

References

1934 births
Living people
Polytechnic Institute of New York University alumni
Members of the United States National Academy of Engineering
Engineers from Shanghai
National Taiwan University alumni
Princeton University faculty
Chinese emigrants to the United States
Taiwanese emigrants to the United States
Foreign members of the Chinese Academy of Sciences
Members of Academia Sinica